The racehorse Dick Turpin won the 1933 Chester Cup, ridden by Gordon Richards, trained by Martin Hartigan. Dick Turpin won by a head, 2nd Guiscard, 3rd Mandritsara. He was owned by Hon Robert Fraser Watson, 2nd son of 1st Baron Manton. The starting price was 9 to 1. Gordon Richards wrote about the horse in his autobiography published in 1955 as follows:
"Dick Turpin was a big horse, and he took a long time to come to hand. We had won a few races with him at the end of his three year old career, and now we thought he had a great chance for the Chester Cup. Of course he was on the big side for the sharp bends of Chester, and we wanted it as soft as possible. When I went out to the paddock, Mr Watson asked me how I was going to ride the horse. I told Mr Watson and Mr Hartigan that they were not to worry if I was last for the whole of the first twice round the course. Off we went. I should think I was a furlong behind the leader for the first twice round, but I had great confidence in Dick Turpin. Then when we started the 3rd circuit, some of them began to tire, and I began winding my way through them. The real thrill started at the last bend, where Freddy Fox moved his mount into the lead, and Weston and Beary went after him. I was then lying 4th, some lengths behind the others, but I had been coming up so fast that it almost looked as if those I passed were standing still. I was still more than a length behind in the last furlong, and I am sure that the vast majority of those watching the race never noticed me, so engrossed must they have been in the tremendous struggle going on in front between Freddy, Tommy and Michael. But a length behind and with less than a hundred yards to go, I asked the long-striding Dick Turpin for his final effort, and the gallant horse got up to beat all 3 of them by a short head, and win the cup. When I got to the winner's enclosure, Mr Watson looked pale and Mr Hartigan was laughing. "Gordon, you frightened the life out of us!" he said. "I told you how it would go", I said".

Footnotes

1929 racehorse births
Thoroughbred family 4-n